Kersaint-Plabennec is a commune in the Finistère department of Brittany in northwestern France.

Population
Inhabitants of Kersaint-Plabennec are called in French Kersaintais.

See also
Communes of the Finistère department

References

External links
Official website 

Mayors of Finistère Association 

Communes of Finistère